The 16th Emmy Awards, later known as the 16th Primetime Emmy Awards, were presented on May 25, 1964.  The ceremony was hosted by Joey Bishop and E. G. Marshall.  Winners are listed in bold and series' networks are in parentheses.

The top shows of the night were repeat winners. The Defenders, won its third consecutive Drama Emmy, while The Dick Van Dyke Show won its second straight Comedy Emmy. The Dick Van Dyke Show tied the record (since broken) for most major category wins, with five.

Winners and nominees

Programs

Acting

Lead performances

Supporting performances

Single performances

Directing

Writing

Most major nominations
By network 
 NBC – 39
 CBS – 36
 ABC – 18

 By program
 Bob Hope Presents the Chrysler Theatre (NBC) – 7
 The Defenders (CBS) / The Dick Van Dyke Show (CBS) / East Side/West Side (CBS) – 6
 The Richard Boone Show (NBC) – 5
 The Doctors and the Nurses (CBS) / The Farmer's Daughter (ABC) / Hallmark Hall of Fame (NBC) / That Was The Week That Was (NBC) – 4

Most major awards
By network 
 CBS – 11
 NBC – 5
 ABC – 3

 By program
 The Dick Van Dyke Show (CBS) – 5
 Bob Hope Presents the Chrysler Theatre (NBC) / The Defenders (CBS) – 3
 The Danny Kaye Show (CBS) / The Making of the President, 1960 (ABC) – 2

Notes

External links
 Emmys.com list of 1964 Nominees & Winners

References

016
Primetime Emmy Awards
Primetime Emmy Awards
Primetime Emmy
Primetime Emmy Awards